Dick Hallo (31 January 1941 – 20 June 2009) was an  Australian rules footballer who played with North Melbourne in the Victorian Football League (VFL).

Notes

External links 

1941 births
2009 deaths
Australian rules footballers from Victoria (Australia)
North Melbourne Football Club players